The Brunei Ladies Open was a women's professional golf tournament in Brunei  tri-sanctioned by the China LPGA Tour, the Brunei Golf Association and the LPGA of Korea Tour (KLPGA).

Winner

Source:

References

External links

LPGA of Korea Tour events
China LPGA Tour events
Golf tournaments in Brunei